Di Giovanni is a surname. Notable people with the surname include:

 Bartolomeo di Giovanni (died 1501), early Renaissance Italian painter
 Benvenuto di Giovanni (c. 1436–1509/1518), Italian painter and artist
 Bertoldo di Giovanni (after 1420–1491), Italian sculptor and medallist
 Matteo di Giovanni (c. 1430–1495), Italian Renaissance artist

Italian-language surnames
Patronymic surnames
Surnames from given names